Blue Knob is a locality in the Northern Rivers region of New South Wales, Australia. In , Blue Knob had a population of 210 people.

Notes

Towns in New South Wales
Northern Rivers
City of Lismore